Bradford "Brad" Bolen (born January 22, 1989, in River Forest, Illinois) is a judoka from United States.

He was in group of 2012 Olympic hopefuls. 
His current biggest success is winning Pan American Judo Championships in 2010 where he stunned the international field of 66 kg players by winning automatically, only after his opponents were disqualified and not even allowed to compete.

Brad is currently the Head Junior Coach at the Jason Morris Judo Center in  Glenville, New York.

Achievements

References

External links 
 
 
 
 

American male judoka
1989 births
Living people
Sportspeople from Cook County, Illinois
People from River Forest, Illinois
Judoka at the 2015 Pan American Games
Pan American Games competitors for the United States